The 2019–20 Junior ABA League was the 3rd season of the Junior ABA League with twelve men's under-19 teams from Serbia, Slovenia, Croatia, Bosnia and Herzegovina, Montenegro and North Macedonia. Teams are the junior selections of the ABA League teams.

On 12 March 2020, the ABA League Assembly temporarily suspended its competitions due to the COVID-19 pandemic. On 27 May 2020, the ABA League Assembly canceled definitely its competitions due to the COVID-19 pandemic.

The Final tournament would have been played on 21–22 March 2020 at the  Železnik Hall, Belgrade. Cibona U19 was the defending champion and as a consequence of the COVID-19 pandemic, the ABA League Assembly decided not to recognize any team as the champion for the season.

Competition system
Twelve under-19 teams are participating in the 2019–20 Junior ABA League season and they are divided into two groups in the first stage. In the group stage, all teams will face each other team within a group in a round-robin system. The two best-placed teams of each group will advance to the final tournament. At the final tournament, the teams will play two games – the semifinal and the final or third-place game. The winner of the final tournament will become the 2019–20 ABA Junior Tournament Champion.

Teams

Team allocation

Locations and personnel

First stage

Twelve participating teams Budućnost VOLI, Cedevita Olimpija, Cibona, Crvena zvezda mts, Igokea, Koper Primorska, Krka, Mega Bemax, Mornar, MZT Skopje Aerodrom, Partizan NIS and Zadar were divided into two first stage groups. The two best placed teams of each group advanced to the final tournament.

Group A
Venue: Mega Factory Hall, Belgrade

Group B

Venue: Jazine Basketball Hall, Zadar

See also
2019–20 Euroleague Basketball Next Generation Tournament

References

External links 
 Official website

U19 ABA League Championship
Junior
Basketball events curtailed and voided due to the COVID-19 pandemic